St. Thomas Aquinas Senior High School is a Ghanaian public day senior high school for boys in the Osu, district of Accra in the Greater Accra Region. The school is currently located in Cantonments, a suburb of Accra. It was established to provide education for boys of the Accra Archdiocese of the Catholic Church whose parents could not afford the then cost of sending their male children to boarding schools. It was established in 1952.

Location
In September 1963, the school relocated to its present permanent site at Cantonment Street, Osu.

The school is situated opposite the European Union offices and the Civil Service Training School, laying between the Cantonment Police Station to its south and The Embassy of Togo to its north, with close proximity to the prime area of the commercial and administrative hub of Osu's Oxford Street.

Academics
The school runs nine streams and five academic programmes.

Affiliation
Aquinas has ties with its sister school, Accra Girls Senior High School, with a strong bond of students' association, which is aimed at sharing entertainments, social activities, and educational exchange, called STAAGA (St. Thomas Aquinas Accra Girls Association).

Motto and slogan
The school's motto is Veritas Liberat, meaning "The truth sets you free", is a Latin variant of Veritas vos liberabit from the Gospel of John chapter 8 verse 32.

Its slogan is "beebɛ", a word in Ghana's native Ga language, meaning "There is no time to waste " or "waste no time".

Uniform
The students wear a white shirt with the school crest christened Veritas Liberat, meaning, "only the truth can set you free", boldly engraved, tucked into a brown Khaki pair of shorts to match. In contemporary times, however, a light-blue shirt for final-year students and the school cloth which is textile, embossed with the school crest, have supplemented the traditional white shirt which was the choice of the founding fathers on Fridays.

Awards
For three consecutive years, 1972, 1973, 1974, the school led West Africa in the Advanced Level Certificate Examination according to statistical figures from the Education Ministry. In 2004, the school won the world cadet championship held in London.  In 2013, the school was deemed the Overall Best High School in Ghana. The same year, 2013, the school won the National Science and Maths Quiz Competition.

The school won the  National Science and Maths Quiz in 2013. St. Thomas Aquinas SHS is the only exclusively day school to have won the trophy.

In 2013, the school came first in the maiden edition of the Science and Technology Fair organized by the Young Educators Foundation (YEF), an education oriented non-governmental organization.
In 2017, the school won the National Science and Technology Fair now sponsored by the government after a four-year hiatus.

The school won the Moot Court Competition for the first time the program was introduced to the second educational cycle.

The school emerged winners of the 2019 Gender Inequality Debate.

Chronological list of headmasters

Notable alumni

List of notable alumni

Academia, politics and religion
 Professor John Owusu Gyapong Vice Chancellor, The University of Health and Allied Sciences, Ho and Former Pro Vice Chancellor, University of Ghana, Legon
 Professor George Hagan – academic and Politician (Convention People's Party's presidential candidate, 2000 general elections, Ghana)
 Professor Abednego Feehi Okoe Amartey, Vice Chancellor of the University of Professional Studies
 Professor Nii Ashie Kotey – An academic and active justice of the Supreme Court of Ghana (2018–) and Former Chief Executive of the Forestry Commission of Ghana, Dean of the Faculty of Law, University of Ghana, Legon and Acting Director of the Ghana School of Law. He was a director of the Ghana Legal Literacy and Resource Foundation and the General Legal Council.
 Rt. Rev. D. S. M. Torto (1978 year group) – bishop, Anglican Diocese of Accra
 Most Rev.Vincent Boi-Nai – Catholic Bishop of Yendi Diocese
[Most Rev.Gabriel Edoe Kumordji  – Catholic Bishop of Keta-Akatsi Diocese
Lord Oblitey Commey - Politician and Director of Operations at The Flagstaff House, the official residence and office of the President of Ghana
 Hon. Benjamin Ayiku Narteh - Member of Parliament for Ledzokuku Constituency

Sports and entertainment
 DJ Vyrusky Kofi Amoako - Official DJ of Shatta Wale and Lynx Entertainment
Laud Quartey - footballer
Elijah Amoo Addo - Chef and food stylist
Yaw Amankwah Mireku - Former Hearts of Oak and Black Stars Player.
Abel Manomey - Former Great Olympics and Dreams Player.

See also

 Roman Catholicism in Ghana
 Education in Ghana
 List of senior high schools in Ghana

References

 http://graphic.com.gh/news/general-news/40597-st-thomas-aquinas-shs-marks-63rd-anniversary.html
 http://edition.myjoyonline.com/pages/education/201306/108195.php
 http://www.saintaquinasschool.com/index.php/aquinas-shs%20/about/chronology-of-heads
http://www.graphic.com.gh/news/general-news/st-thomas-aquinas-shs-wins-national-science-technology-fair.html

External links
, the school's official website

1952 establishments in Gold Coast (British colony)
Boys' schools in Ghana
Divine Word Missionaries Order
Educational institutions established in 1952
Catholic secondary schools in Ghana
Schools in Accra
People educated at St. Thomas Aquinas Senior High School
High schools in Ghana
Education in Accra
Educational institutions established in 1924
Boarding schools in Ghana
1924 establishments in Gold Coast (British colony)
Alumni of Achimota School
Christian schools in Ghana
Public schools in Ghana
Greater Accra Region
Mixed schools in Ghana